Donald Wayne Osgood is an American criminologist and professor emeritus of criminology and sociology at Pennsylvania State University.

He has been a fellow of the American Society of Criminology since 2005, and he was the lead editor of their official journal, Criminology, from 2011 through 2017.  He is also a Life Member of Clare Hall, Cambridge, since 2011.

References

External links
Faculty page

Curriculum vitae

American criminologists
Living people
Pennsylvania State University faculty
University of California, Los Angeles alumni
University of Colorado Boulder alumni
Academic journal editors
Year of birth missing (living people)